Arbën Xhaferi (24 January 1948 – 15 August 2012) was a Macedonian politician of Albanian origin. He was born in Tetovo, Yugoslavia, and died in 2012 at the Skopje Hospital after a cerebral hemorrhage. Xhaferi was president of the Democratic Party of Albanians, an ethnic Albanian political party in the Republic of North Macedonia, and was an advocate of rights for ethnic Albanians in the country. He is best known for calling for a change in the Preamble of the Constitution. He published two works focusing on the Albanians in North Macedonia, "The DPA Non-Paper", and "The Challenges of Democracy in Multiethnic States," reiterating the beliefs of the PDPA.

Early life and professional career
Xhaferi passed most of his life in Pristina. He returned to the biggest Albanian Party, the Party for Democratic Prosperity in years of big contradictions, which ended with the division of this party. From this party came the Albanian Democratic Party, led by Xhaferi until 2007, when he became an honorary leader.

External links
 Një ditë me kryetarin z. Menduh Thaçi
 Ndërroi jetë Arbën Xhaferi
 Macedonia, Arbën Xhaferi passes away
 Who was Arbën Xhaferi?
 Leader of Ethnic Albanians in Macedonia Dies
 R 6 Motorway (Kosovo)

1948 births
2012 deaths
Albanians in North Macedonia
Democratic Party of Albanians politicians
People from Tetovo